The Andy Warhol Museum is located on the North Shore of Pittsburgh, Pennsylvania, in the United States. It is the largest museum in North America dedicated to a single artist.  The museum holds an extensive permanent collection of art and archives from the Pittsburgh-born pop art icon Andy Warhol.

The Andy Warhol Museum is one of the four Carnegie Museums of Pittsburgh and is a collaborative project of the Carnegie Institute, the Dia Art Foundation and The Andy Warhol Foundation for the Visual Arts (AWFVA).

The museum is located in an  facility on seven floors.  Containing 17 galleries, the museum features 900 paintings, close to 2,000 works on paper, over 1,000 published unique prints, 77 sculptures, 4,000 photographs, and over 4,350 Warhol films and videotaped works. Its most recent operating budget (2010) was $6.1 million.  In addition to its Pittsburgh location the museum has sponsored 56 traveling exhibits that have attracted close to nine million visitors in 153 venues worldwide since 1996.

History

Plans for the museum were announced in October 1989, about 2½ years after Warhol's death.  At the time of the announcement, works worth an estimated $80 million were donated to the newly announced museum by the AWFVA and the Dia Art Foundation. Thomas N. Armstrong III, who had been the director of the Whitney Museum of American Art from 1974 to 1990, was named the museum's first director in 1993. Matt Wrbican joined the staff of the museum before it opened, inventorying Warhol's belongings in New York, and has become the archivist and an expert on Warhol's work.

By 1993, the  industrial warehouse and its extensive renovations had cost about $12 million, and the AWFVA had donated more than 1,000 of Warhol's works worth over $55 million, a donation that grew to about 3,000 works.

On May 13–14, 1994, the museum attracted about 25,000 visitors to its opening weekend.  Armstrong, its founding director, resigned nine months after its opening; at the time of his resignation, the museum had had "tense relations" with the AWFVA and the Carnegie Institute, its financial backer, though The New York Times could find no one involved who would say whether that friction played a role in Armstrong's resignation.

On November 1, 1997, the AWFVA donated all Warhol film and video copyrights to the museum.

In 2013, it was announced that in Manhattan, New York City, in the Essex Crossing development on the Lower East Side, an annex to the main Pittsburgh museum was scheduled to open by 2017.
 However, the museum announced in March 2015 that it had dropped its plans to open the New York annex.

In October 2019, an audio tape of publicly unknown music by Lou Reed, based on Warhol's 1975 book, “The Philosophy of Andy Warhol: From A to B and Back Again”, was reported to have been discovered in an archive at the museum in Pittsburgh.

In 2022, the museum announced a $60M expansion deemed The 'Pop District' covering six blocks in Pittsburgh, PA. The expansion looks to build a music venue, a social media studio called Warhol Creative, and expand places for public art exhibits. The project is expected to take ten years and is funded primarily through local foundations.

In popular culture

 The 2010 film She's Out of My League filmed a key scene at the museum during an evening event.  The film's subject was hosting the event.
 The Andy Warhol Diaries (TV series) in 2022 prominently featured museum staff as narrators of Warhol's life.

See also
 List of single-artist museums
 Andy Warhol Museum of Modern Art, Medzilaborce, Slovakia

References

External links

 
 Warhol Foundation for the Visual Arts

Andy Warhol
Art museums established in 1994
Andy Warhol
Warhol, Andy
Museums established in 1994
Museums in Pittsburgh
Pittsburgh History & Landmarks Foundation Historic Landmarks
1994 establishments in Pennsylvania
Museums devoted to one artist